Rancho Alegre is an unincorporated area and census-designated place (CDP) in Jim Wells County, Texas, United States. The population was 1,704 at the 2010 census.

Geography
Rancho Alegre is located in central Jim Wells County at  (27.739945, -98.093028). It is bordered to the northeast by Alice, the county seat, and to the south by unincorporated Alice Acres.

Demographics
As of the census of 2000, there were 1,775 people, 544 households, and 441 families residing in the CDP. The population density was 1,412.5 people per square mile (543.9/km2). There were 602 housing units at an average density of 479.1/sq mi (184.5/km2). The racial makeup of the CDP was 79.15% White, 0.73% African American, 0.73% Native American, 0.06% Asian, 17.41% from other races, and 1.92% from two or more races. Hispanic or Latino of any race were 90.99% of the population.

There were 544 households, out of which 43.2% had children under the age of 18 living with them, 54.8% were married couples living together, 19.7% had a female householder with no husband present, and 18.9% were non-families. 17.5% of all households were made up of individuals, and 7.7% had someone living alone who was 65 years of age or older. The average household size was 3.26 and the average family size was 3.67.

In the CDP, the population was spread out, with 34.0% under the age of 18, 11.8% from 18 to 24, 25.5% from 25 to 44, 18.8% from 45 to 64, and 9.8% who were 65 years of age or older. The median age was 28 years. For every 100 females, there were 96.8 males. For every 100 females age 18 and over, there were 91.0 males.

The median income for a household in the CDP was $22,534, and the median income for a family was $23,920. Males had a median income of $19,769 versus $14,489 for females. The per capita income for the CDP was $8,963. About 32.6% of families and 31.6% of the population were below the poverty line, including 36.7% of those under age 18 and 40.4% of those age 65 or over.

Education
Rancho Alegre is served by the Alice Independent School District. The district operates Alice High School.

References

Census-designated places in Jim Wells County, Texas
Census-designated places in Texas